Gereh Cheqa or Gareh Choqa or Gareh Cheqa or Goreh Choqa may refer to:
 Gareh Choqa, Hamadan
 Gereh Cheqa, Ilam
 Goreh Choqa, Kermanshah
 Gareh Choqa, alternate name of Gorgeh Choqa, Kermanshah Province
 Gereh Cheqa, Kurdistan